Kannur, formerly known in English as Cannanore, is a city and a municipal corporation in the state of Kerala, India. During the period of British colonial rule in India, when Kannur was a part of the Malabar District (Madras Presidency), the city was known as Cannanore. Kannur is the sixth largest urban agglomeration in Kerala. As of 2011 census, Kannur Municipal Corporation, the local body which administers mainland area of city, had a population of 232,486.

Kannur was the headquarters of Kolathunadu, one of the four most important dynasties on the Malabar Coast, along with the Zamorin of Calicut, Kingdom of Cochin and Kingdom of Quilon. The Arakkal kingdom had right over the city of Kannur and Laccadive Islands in the late medieval period. Kannur municipality was formed on 1 November 1866 by the Madras Act 10 of 1865 (Amendment of the Improvements in Towns Act 1850) of the British Indian Empire, along with the municipalities of Thalassery, Kozhikode, Palakkad and Fort Kochi, making them the first modern municipalities in the state. It was upgraded into a municipal corporation in 2015.

Kannur Cantonment is the only cantonment board in Kerala. The Indian Naval Academy at Ezhimala is Asia's largest, and the world's third-largest, naval academy. Muzhappilangad beach is the longest drive-in beach in Asia and appeared among the top six best beaches for driving in the world in a BBC Top Gear article. During British rule, Kannur's chief importance laid in producing Thalassery pepper.

History

Pre-history and Ancient era
The earliest evidence of human habitation in the region are rock-cut caves and megalithic burial sites of the Neolithic age. The Taliparamba-Kannur-Thalassery area abounds in rock-cut caves, dolmens, burial stone circles and menhirs, all of megalith. Kannur District was the seat of powerful kingdom based at Ezhimala in the Sangam period (1st–5th century CE). The ancient port of Naura, which is mentioned in the Periplus of the Erythraean Sea as a port somewhere north of Muziris is identified with Kannur. Pliny the Elder (1st century CE) states that the port of Tyndis was located at the northwestern border of Keprobotos (Chera dynasty). The region, which lies north of the port at Tyndis, was ruled by the kingdom of Ezhimala during the Sangam period.

According to the Periplus of the Erythraean Sea, a region known as Limyrike began at Naura and Tyndis. However the Ptolemy mentions only Tyndis as the Limyrikes starting point. The region probably ended at Kanyakumari; it thus roughly corresponds to the present-day Malabar Coast. The value of Rome's annual trade with the region was estimated at around 50,000,000 sesterces. Pliny the Elder mentioned that Limyrike was prone by pirates. The Cosmas Indicopleustes mentioned that the Limyrike was a source of peppers.Das, Santosh Kumar (2006). The Economic History of Ancient India. Genesis Publishing Pvt Ltd. p. 301.

The kingdom of Ezhimala had jurisdiction over two Nadus – The coastal Poozhinadu and the hilly eastern Karkanadu. According to the works of Sangam literature, Poozhinadu consisted much of the coastal belt between Mangalore and Kozhikode. Karkanadu consisted of Wayanad-Gudalur hilly region with parts of Kodagu (Coorg). It is said that Nannan, the most renowned ruler of Ezhimala dynasty, took refuge at Wayanad hills in the 5th century CE when he was lost to Cheras, just before his execution in a battle, according to the Sangam works.

Early Middle Ages
According to Kerala Muslim tradition, Kannur along with surrounding Madayi and Dharmadom were home to three of the oldest mosques in the Indian subcontinent. According to the Legend of Cheraman Perumals, the first Indian mosque was built in 624 AD at Kodungallur with the mandate of the last the ruler (the Cheraman Perumal) of Chera dynasty, who left from Dharmadom to Mecca and converted to Islam during the lifetime of Prophet Muhammad (c. 570–632). According to Qissat Shakarwati Farmad, the Masjids at Kodungallur, Kollam, Madayi, Barkur, Mangalore, Kasaragod, Kannur, Dharmadam, Panthalayani, and Chaliyam, were built during the era of Malik Dinar, and they are among the oldest Masjids in the Indian subcontinent. It is believed that Malik Dinar died at Thalangara in Kasaragod town.

Ezhimala kingdom was succeeded by Mushika dynasty in the early medieval period, most possibly due to the migration of Tuluva Brahmins from Tulu Nadu. The Mushika-vamsha Mahakavya, written by Athula in the 11th century, throws light on the recorded past of the Mushika Royal Family up until that point. The Indian anthropologist Ayinapalli Aiyappan states that a powerful and warlike clan of the Bunt community of Tulu Nadu was called Kola Bari and the Kolathiri Raja of Kolathunadu was a descendant of this clan. The kingdom of Kolathunadu, who were the descendants of Mushika dynasty, at the peak of its power reportedly extended from Netravati River (Mangalore) in the north to Korapuzha (Kozhikode) in the south with Arabian Sea on the 
west and Kodagu hills on the eastern boundary, also including the isolated islands of Lakshadweep in the Arabian Sea.

An Old Malayalam inscription (Ramanthali inscriptions), dated to 1075 CE, mentioning king Kunda Alupa, the ruler of Alupa dynasty of Mangalore, can be found at Ezhimala near Kannur. The Arabic inscription on a copper slab within the Madayi Mosque in Kannur records its foundation year as 1124 CE. In his book on travels (Il Milione), Marco Polo recounts his visit to the area in the mid 1290s. Other visitors included Faxian, the Buddhist pilgrim and Ibn Batuta, writer and historian of Tangiers. The Kolathunadu in the late medieval period emerged into independent 10 principalities i.e., Kadathanadu (Vadakara), Randathara or Poyanad (Dharmadom), Kottayam (Thalassery), Nileshwaram, Iruvazhinadu (Panoor, Kurumbranad etc., under separate royal chieftains due to the outcome of internal dissensions. The Nileshwaram dynasty on the northernmost part of Kolathiri dominion, were relatives to both Kolathunadu as well as the Zamorin of Calicut, in the early medieval period.

Kannur was an important trading center in the 12th century, with active business connections with Persia and Arabia. The port at Kozhikode held the superior economic and political position in medieval Kerala coast, while Kannur, Kollam, and Kochi, were commercially important secondary ports, where the traders from various parts of the world would gather.

Era of European influences
Kannur served as the East India Company military headquarters on India's west coast until 1887. The modern town is referred to as Kannur Town. Kannur, as a district and surrounding areas, were mostly ruled by the famous Kolathiri Rajas. When the state of Kerala was formed the district took the name Kannur since the administrative offices were established here. Before that, Kannur was the headquarters of Chirakkal taluk of Malabar District in the Madras Presidency. During the period of Company rule in India, the East India Company preferred Madras and Cochin as their major stations and Kannur started to lose its old glory. The people of Kannur are still waiting for their old glory to get back and they feel they are being sidelined because the state administration is located the exact opposite side of the state. Part of the original city of Kannur was under Kerala's only Muslim Royalty called the Arakkal and this area is still known as city.

The Portuguese explorer Vasco da Gama arrived at Kappad Kozhikode in 1498 during the Age of Discovery, thus opening a direct sea route from Europe to South Asia. In 1501 a Portuguese factory was planted here by Pedro Álvares Cabral, and in 1502 da Gama made a treaty with the Raja. The St. Angelo Fort at Kannur was built in 1505 by Dom Francisco de Almeida, the first Portuguese Viceroy of India. The Dutch captured the fort from the Portuguese in 1663. They modernised the fort and built the bastions Hollandia, Zeelandia, and Frieslandia that are the major features of the present structure. The original Portuguese fort was pulled down later. A painting of this fort and the fishing ferry behind it can be seen in the Rijksmuseum Amsterdam. The Dutch sold the fort to king Ali Raja of Arakkal in 1772.

During the 17th century, Kannur was the capital city of the only Muslim Sultanate in Kerala, known as Arakkal, who also ruled the Laccadive Islands in addition to the city of Kannur. Arakkal Kingdom and Chirakkal kingdom were two vassal kingdoms based in the city of Kannur. The island of Dharmadom near Kannur, along with Thalassery, was ceded to the East India Company as early as 1734, which were claimed by all of the Kolattu Rajas, Kottayam Rajas, Mannanar and  Arakkal Bibi in the late medieval period, where the British initiated a factory and English settlement following the cession. Then the East India Company captured the fort Kannur in 1790 and used it as one of their major military stations on the Malabar Coast. During the period of British colonial rule, Kannur was part of the Madras province in the Malabar District.

In 1761, the British captured Mahé, and the settlement was handed over to the ruler of Kadathanadu. The British restored Mahé to the French as a part of the 1763 Treaty of Paris. In 1779, the Anglo-French war broke out, resulting in the French loss of Mahé. In 1783, the British agreed to restore to the French their settlements in India, and Mahé was handed over to the French in 1785.

Initially the British had to suffer local resistance against their rule under the leadership of Kerala Varma Pazhassi Raja, who had popular support in Thalassery-Wayanad region. The guerrilla war launched by Pazhassi Raja, the ruler of Kottayam province, against the East India Company had a huge impact on the history of Kannur. Changes in the socio-economic and political sectors in Kerala during the initial decades of the 20th century created conditions congenial for the growth of the Communist Party. Extension of English education initiated by Christian missionaries in 1906 and later carried forward by government, rebellion for wearing a cloth to cover upper parts of body, installing an idol at Aruvippuram in 1888, Malayali Memorial in 1891, establishment of SNDP Yogam in 1903, activities, struggles etc. became factors helpful to accelerate changes in Kerala society during a short time. These movements eventually coalesced into the Indian independence movement.

Very soon, ideas about socialism and Soviet Revolution reached Kerala. Such ideas got propagated in Kerala through the works of Swadeshabhimani Ramakrishna Pillai, Sahodaran Ayyappan, P. Kesavadev and others. By the beginning of the 1930s, some other useful developments were taking place. Important among them was Nivarthana Agitation in Travancore. That was the demand of people suppressed so far as untouchables and weaker sections for participation in government. This brought to the forefront struggles like proportional representation in government and reservation of jobs. This imparted a new enthusiasm among oppressed masses.

 Geography and climate 

 Kannur has an elevation of  along the coast of the Laccadive Sea, with a sandy coastal area. The city has an -long seashore and a -long beach at Payyambalam. Kannur is located north of Kozhikode, south of Kasargod and Mangalore, west of the Western Ghat regions of Kodagu and Wayanad, and east of the Laccadive Sea. Mappila Bay harbour at Ayikkara. On one side, there is St. Angelo Fort (built in 1505) and on the other side is Arakkal palace. Muzhappilangad Beach, the longest Drive-in Beach in Asia, is located in Kannur. Vayalapra Lake is near Madayi.

 Climate 
Kannur experiences a very wet tropical monsoon climate (Am under the Köppen climate classification.) Like other areas on the Malabar Coast, this city receives heavy rainfall during the Southwest monsoon.

 Civic administration 

Kannur municipality was formed on 1 November 1866 according to the Madras Act 10 of 1865 (Amendment of the Improvements in Towns act 1850) of the British Indian Empire, along with the municipalities of Thalassery, Kozhikode, Palakkad, and Fort Kochi, making them the first modern municipalities in the state. It was upgraded into a Municipal Corporation in the year 2015.

The city is administered by the Kannur Municipal Corporation, headed by a mayor. The corporation is headed by a Mayor and council, and manages 78.35 km2 of Kannur city, with a population of about 232,486 within that area. For administrative purposes, the city is divided into 55 wards, from which the members of the corporation council are elected for five years. Kannur Municipal Corporation is divided into six zones: Kannur town, Pallikunnu, Puzhathi, Edakkad, Elayavoor, and Chelora.

Kannur Corporation is the fifth City Corporation in Kerala after the creation of the state. Established in 2015, Kannur Corporation's first mayor was E. P. Latha. Kannur corporation has two assembly constituencies – Kannur and Azhikode – both of which are part of Kannur parliamentary constituency.

Kannur Municipal Corporation Election 2020

Kannur Municipal Corporation Election 2015

Law and order
The Kannur City Police is headed by a commissioner, an Indian Police Service (IPS) officer. The city is divided into some zones each under a circle officer. Apart from regular law and order, the city police comprise the traffic police, bomb squad, dog squad, fingerprint bureau, women's cell, juvenile wing, narcotics cell, riot force, armed reserve camps, district crime records bureau and a women's station. It operates several police stations functioning under the Home Ministry of Government of Kerala.

Demographics

Males constitute 46.2% of the population and females 53.8%. Kannur has an average literacy rate of 96.23%, higher than the national average of 74.04%. Male literacy is 98% and female literacy is 94%. In Kannur, 12% of the population is under six years of age.

The Anglo-Indian community in Kannur live mainly in the Kannur Cantonment of Burnacherry and its surrounding areas of Thillery, No.3 Bazaar and Camp Bazaar. Malayalam is the administrative and local language.

 Education 

 Indian Naval Academy is situated in Ezhimala, Kannur. Naval cadets are trained here in 2500 acres vast campus. Kannur District has five Kendriya Vidyalaya at Kannur, Keltron Nagar, Payyanur, Ezhimala, and Thalassery, Peringome.

Kannur University was established by Act 22 of 1996 of the Kerala Legislative Assembly. The university by the name "Malabar University" had come into existence earlier by the promulgation of an ordinance by the governor of Kerala, on 9 November 1995. The university was inaugurated on 2 March 1996 by A. K. Antony, the Chief Minister of Kerala. The objective of the Kannur University Act 1996 was to establish in the state of Kerala a teaching, residential and affiliating university so as to provide for the development of higher education in Kasargod and Kannur revenue districts and the Mananthavady Taluk of Wayanad district. Kannur University is a multi-campus university.

Government Brennen College, the first college in Kannur, established in the year 1862, provide education to more than 2500 students. Government College of Engineering, Kannur was established in 1986 near Dharmasala, Kannur as a center for imparting engineering education in northern Kerala. The college is among the top ten engineering colleges of the state, providing higher studies in the field of technical education.

The Government Medical College, Kannur was established in 1993 at Pariyaram to serve Kannur city and surroundings.

 Media 

Many local cable television channels are available in Kannur. The most popular cable channels are City Channel, City Gold, City Juke, Network Channels, Zeal Network, Kannur Vision, World Vision, Worldvision Music, Chakkarakkal, Gramika channel Koothuparamba and Kannurone

All India Radio is broadcast in Kannur at 101.5  MHz.
Private FM radio stations in Kannur include: Radio Mango 91.9 (Malayala Manorama Co Ltd), Club FM 94.3 (Mathrubhumi Printing And Publishing Co Ltd), Red FM 93.5 (Sun Network) and Best FM 95.0 (Asianet Communications Ltd)

A number of newspapers are published from Kannur, including the Malayala Manorama, Mathrubhumi, Madhyamam, Deshabhimani, Deepika, Rashtra Deepika, Chandrika, Kerala Kaumudi, Mangalam, Janmabhumi, Veekshanam, Thejas, Siraj, Suprabhaatham, Janayugom and The New Indian Express.

Kannur Cuisine

The Kannur cuisine depicts it culture and heritage. It is famous for Malabar biriyani. The city of is also famous for Haluva called as Sweet Meat by Europeans due to the texture of the sweet. Another speciality is banana chips, which are made crisp and wafer-thin. Other popular dishes include seafood preparations (prawns, mussels, mackerel) . Vegetarian fare includes the sadya.

Kannur cuisine is a blend of traditional Kerala, Persian, Yemenese and Arab food culture. This confluence of culinary cultures is best seen in the preparation of most dishes. Kallummakkaya (mussels) curry, irachi puttu (irachi meaning meat), parottas (soft flatbread), Pathiri (a type of rice pancake) and ghee rice are some of the other specialties. The characteristic use of spices is the hallmark of Kannur cuisine—black pepper, cardamom and clove are used profusely.

The Kerala version of biryani, popularly known as kuzhi mandi in Malayalam is another popular item, which has an influence from Yemen. Various varieties of biriyanis like Thalassery biriyani, and Kannur biriyani, are prepared here.
 	
The snacks include unnakkaya (deep-fried, boiled ripe banana paste covering a mixture of cashew, raisins and sugar), pazham nirachathu (ripe banana filled with coconut grating, molasses or sugar), muttamala made of eggs, chatti pathiri, a dessert made of flour, like a baked, layered chapati with rich filling, arikkadukka, and more.

 Transportation 

Kannur has a good road network connecting to Mangalore, Bangalore, Mysore, Kodagu and Cochin. The railway station is also well connected to all parts of India. The Kannur International Airport which is about 26 km from the city began operations on 9 December and is the fourth international airport in the state. Other nearby airports are at Calicut, Mysore and Mangalore.
This highway is scheduled to be expanded to four lanes. A bypass for Kannur city is proposed under the NH widening project.
Kannur is connected to Kodagu, Mysore and Bangalore in Karnataka by the Kannur-Coorg-Mysore Highway. This highway is upgraded to National Highway in 2017.

All trains including the Thiruvananthapuram Rajdhani Express and  Garib Rath stop at Kannur. Six daily trains and around 15 weekly or bi-weekly trains connect Kannur to the capital Thiruvananthapuram. Kannur is well connected through rail with Mangalore and Kozhikode.
Kannur South railway station and Edakkad railway stations are located under Kannur Corporation limits. Chirakkal railway station is located north of the city. Only passenger trains halt at these three stations.

Kannur International Airport in Mattanur inaugurated on 9 December 2018. It is the fourth international airport in Kerala. The airport has a  runway (the longest in the State) and state of the art passenger terminal as well other amenities. It is well connected by a comprehensive network of roads and a proposal for railway line has also been mooted. In the 2016–17 Union Railway budget,  were dedicated for under Extra Budgetary Resource (EBR) in which a part of the bill will be borne by the State Government towards the railway line.

Notable peopleLiterature: Sukumar Azhikode, Oyyarathu Chandu Menon, Cherusseri Namboothiri, N. Prabhakaran, T. Padmanabhan, T. K. D. MuzhappilangadSports: Jimmy George, V. P. Sathyan, Denson Devadas, C. K. Vineeth, Sahal Abdul Samad, Tintu Luka, Chundangapoyil RizwanPolitical leaders: M. V. Raghavan, Pinarayi Vijayan, K. Karunakaran, E. K. Nayanar, K. K. Shailaja, E. Ahamed, Kodiyeri Balakrishnan, E. P. Jayarajan, Kadannappalli Ramachandran, K. SudhakaranActors: Sreenivasan, 
M. N. Nambiar, Malavika Mohanan, Samvrutha Sunil, Mamta Mohandas, Vineeth, Vineeth Kumar, Deepak Parambol, Sanusha, Sanoop Santhosh, Nikhila Vimal, Nivetha Thomas, Sreekala Sasidharan, Sneha Paliyeri, Anju Aravind, Athmiya Rajan, Sruthi Lakshmi, Parvathy Nambiar, Ganapathi S Poduval, Madonna Sebastian, Sana Khan, Santhosh KeezhattoorFilmmakers: Bejoy Nambiar, Salim Ahamed, Vineeth Sreenivasan, Dhyan SreenivasanMusic (Composers):Kaithapram Damodaran Namboothiri, Kannur Rajan, Deepak Dev, Ifthi, Shaan Rahman, 
Sushin Shyam, Sayanora PhilipMusic (Playback singers): Vineeth Sreenivasan, Shaan Rahman, Sushin Shyam, Sayanora Philip, Arun AlatCinematographer: K. U. MohananDancer:' Shamna Kasim

See also
Kannur North
Kannur East
Places of worship in Kannur district

References

External links

 Official website
 Official website (Alternative URL)

 
Metropolitan cities in India
Former Portuguese colonies
Cities and towns in Kannur district
Populated coastal places in India